Marcus Bontempelli (born 24 November 1995) is a professional Australian rules footballer playing for the Western Bulldogs in the Australian Football League (AFL). He has served as Western Bulldogs captain since the 2020 season, and was previously the vice-captain from 2018 to 2019.

Bontempelli was drafted with the fourth selection in the 2013 AFL draft. He made his AFL debut in the 2014 AFL season. He received a nomination for the 2014 AFL Rising Star award in round 13 of the 2014 season, placing second in the overall count at the conclusion of the season. Since then, he has been an AFL Premiership player, three-time All-Australian, three-time Charles Sutton Medallist, and a recipient of the AFLCA Champion Player of the Year Award. He has polled a total of 97 career Brownlow Medal votes.

Early life
Bontempelli was raised in Eltham in the north eastern suburbs of Melbourne, Victoria. He was the third of four children to father, Carlo and mother, Geraldine. He was educated at Marcellin College, and played junior football for the Eltham Panthers in the Northern Football Basketball League junior divisions. Bontempelli was the sports captain at Marcellin College in his final year, and he played for both the 1st XVIII football team and the 1st basketball team. He notably had a game where he collected 50 disposals and kicked 10 goals. Bontempelli had a successful time playing basketball before turning to Australian rules football, playing in two winning school basketball premierships and becoming a National School Boys basketball champion.

Bontempelli played for the Northern Knights in the TAC Cup for the 2013 season. After originally playing as a floating half back and forward, Bontempelli moved into the midfield during his time with the Knights. He participated in 19 games and kicked 115 goals throughout the season, while also being selected in the 2013 TAC Cup Team on the interchange bench. He also played for Vic Metro in the AFL Under 18 Championships in 2013, primarily in the half back and wing positions. While playing for Vic Metro, he had a disposal efficiency of 79 percent.

Initially, it was not clear where Bontempelli was likely to be selected in the 2013 AFL draft. Some sources had Bontempelli ranging from pick four to even as far down as pick 15. There were talks of  trying to obtain Bontempelli after it was stated they were prepared to send their eleventh selection and forward Stewart Crameri in exchange for pick four. However, this did not eventuate. Bontempelli ended up getting selected with the fourth selection in the draft, behind Tom Boyd, Josh Kelly, and Jack Billings.

AFL career

2014–2015: Early career
On debut, Bontempelli collected 14 disposals and 5 tackles, beginning to build his reputation as a high pressure player. In round 15, Bontempelli kicked a remarkable goal tight up on the boundary in the final minutes of the match to give the Dogs a one-goal win over Melbourne. Bontempelli was awarded the Chris Grant best first-year player in 2014, alongside the AFL Players Association best first-year player award. He finished second in the AFL Rising Star in the same year, losing to  player Lewis Taylor by a single vote. His outstanding performance in his debut year meant that he was also selected in the 22 Under 22 team, alongside teammate Tom Liberatore. Bontempelli polled 4 votes at the 2014 Brownlow Medal count that year, including three in his standout performance against  in round 15.

Bontempelli continued to improve over the course of the 2015 season, playing all games except for round three and round ten, when he was injured with an adductor strain. In 2015 he picked up a career-high 28 disposals while playing , also kicking 2 goals, taking 7 marks and collecting 7 tackles. He was named as one of their best on ground. Bontempelli the came third in the Charles Sutton Medal, the award for the Best and fairest player for the Western Bulldogs. He was only topped by Easton Wood and Bob Murphy in the count. On top of this, he more than tripled his Brownlow Medal votes from last season, leading the club for total Brownlow votes that season after picking up thirteen votes at just the age of 19. Six of those votes were in the first two rounds after back-to-back best on ground performances, while he collected two other best on ground performances in round 15 and round 22. He was once again named in the 22 Under 22 team as a midfielder. He signed a long-term contract with the Bulldogs in September, keeping him at the club until 2019.

2016–2017: Premiership success
Bontempelli had his best year yet in 2016, playing every single game of the season, including the  fairytale premiership win. Bontempelli was elevated into the club's leadership group at the beginning of the year. Bontempelli collected a career-high 33 disposals in the Bulldogs' round 8 match against . During the 2015 and 2016 period, he was often used during ruck contests, getting at least one hitout in 40 out of his 47 games during this period. On 5 June 2016, in the absence of acting captain Easton Wood, who was filling in for injured regular captain Robert Murphy, Bontempelli captained the Western Bulldogs against  at Etihad Stadium, becoming the youngest match day captain in the AFL since Jack Trengove in 2012. With the Bulldogs winning the match by eight points, Bontempelli became the youngest player in history to captain a VFL/AFL side to victory at 20 years and 194 days of age. He was instrumental in the Bulldogs' four consecutive finals, including the 2016 AFL Grand Final, which was the club's first premiership victory in 62 years. His season was rewarded with the Charles Sutton Medal, finishing 71 votes clear of second-placed Dale Morris. He also won the John Schultz Community Award. He received 20 votes in the 2016 Brownlow Medal, the highest of any player for the Bulldogs in 2016, and his highest total to that date. He had five games in which he was voted best on ground, and finished 8th overall in the voting. Bontempelli made the 22 under 22 team for the third year in a row, named the captain of the team. He also made the All-Australian team for the first time, named on the interchange bench, alongside veteran teammate Matthew Boyd. 

Bontempelli missed the 2017 JLT Community Series after a minor ankle injury at the club's pre-season camp in January. He had season-best games against Carlton in round 2 and Sydney in round 17, kicking 2 goals and collecting 30 disposals in each game. He led the team in total number of behinds, tackles, inside 50s, clearances, contested marks and contested possessions by the end of the season. Former  and  great Gerald Healy described Bontempelli as someone who 'could end his career as the greatest player in the history of the Western Bulldogs', after his 23 disposal, 2 goal performance against  in round 20. After another great season for the Bulldogs, Bontempelli claimed his second Charles Sutton Medal, and was once again named as captain of the 22 under 22 team, his fourth consecutive year being named in the team and second consecutive year as captain. On 20 November 2017, Bontempelli was named vice-captain of the club for the 2018 AFL season, following Murphy's retirement and Wood's elevation to captain from vice-captain. Bontempelli had a similar vote count to his previous year in the 2017 Brownlow Medal, with a total of 19 votes, including 6 best on ground games in rounds 2, 6, 7, 14, 17 and 20. He finished in 7th.

2018–2019: Vice-captaincy
Bontempelli played all but one game in the 2018 AFL season, in a disappointing season for the Bulldogs where they missed finals for the second year in a row. On 10 July 2018, Bontempelli was taken to hospital with severe appendicitis and had surgery to resolve the issue. Bontempelli was then placed on the sidelines in order to allow him to recover from the surgery, and subsequently missed round 7. This meant he missed what was due to be his 100th game. Bontempelli broke his career high record for disposals twice in two consecutive matches in rounds 21 and 22, against  and  respectively. Bontempelli came 3rd in the Charles Sutton Medal count, behind Lachie Hunter and Jack Macrae. For the fifth consecutive year, Bontempelli was named in the 22 under 22 team, setting the record as the first player to be named in the 22 under 22 team for 5 consecutive years. He only polled 9 votes in the 2018 Brownlow Medal, his lowest count since his debut year. Bontempelli signed a three-year contract extension with the Bulldogs in November, after which he stated "I’ve made no secret about the love I have for the Club, and how I want to play a key role in the future success of this playing group,". After questions as to why he only signed a shorter deal than expected, Bontempelli said "There’s a bit of intrinsic value for me to continue to stay accountable to what I want to achieve. As an individual player I think I’ve got a lot of growth ahead of me and it keeps me invested from day to day."

Bontempelli had another successful year in 2019, taking the Bulldogs to the finals series as the team's vice-captain. Bontempelli had 5 games where he collected 30 or more disposals. His 27 disposal, 3 goal performance in round 7 against the future premiers, was one of his best for the season. A high bump from Bontempelli on  defender Nick Haynes in the penultimate round of the season resulted in Haynes getting a fractured larynx and Bontempelli narrowly missing suspension. Bontempelli made the All-Australian squad for the second time in his career. He was named on the wing, as there was fierce competition for the highly contested midfield spots. Bontempelli also won the AFL Coaches Association Player of the Year award, winning with a total of 107 votes, 17 votes ahead of second placed Patrick Dangerfield. He was the first  player to win the award since it was first introduced in 2003, with 312 game Bulldog player Bob Murphy describing him as a "generational player". Bontempelli won the Charles Sutton Medal for the 3rd time, gathering 299 votes, giving him a margin of 29 votes against the second placed Josh Dunkley.

In December 2019, Easton Wood stood down as Western Bulldogs captain, and Bontempelli was announced as the new captain from 2020. Bontempelli tied with fellow Bulldog Jack Macrae to collect 22 votes in the 2019 Brownlow Medal, judged best on field in 5 games – rounds 1, 3, 15, 19 and 20.

2020–: Captaincy

Bontempelli captained the Bulldogs to the finals series in a relatively fruitful year, playing every single game. He was selected to represent Victoria in the State of Origin for Bushfire Relief Match, played in February 2020. He played with teammate Jack Macrae and against fellow Bulldog Jason Johannisen. In the match, he kicked 2 goals. In the main 2020 AFL season, Bontempelli had a stand out game against  in round 12, where he had 33 disposals, 2 goals and 12 clearances. Bontempelli was again recognised for his impressive performance throughout the season, and was named in the All-Australian team for the third time in his career, and the second year in a row, this time as a forward. His selection on the forward line caused backlash as Bontempelli, primarily a midfielder, took the spot of forward that 'could have gone to players that primarily play in the forward line'. Bontempelli came runner up in the Charles Sutton Medal voting, losing to defender Caleb Daniel by a mere 10 votes. He also won the club's Scott West Most Courageous Player Award. Bontempelli polled 10 brownlow votes in the 2020 Brownlow Medal count, placing him at 22nd overall in the count.

After a mediocre opening round to the 2021 AFL season, Bontempelli lifted his performance dramatically and had a best on ground performance the following week, kicking the winning goal to seal the win against . Bontempelli played his 150th AFL career game in round 5, where the  strongly defeated . He was named as the game's best on ground by most media sources, after his 33 disposals and 3 goals helped the Bulldogs win their fifth game in a row, seeing the Bulldogs go undefeated for 5 rounds for the first time since 1946. Bontempelli again led his team to victory in round 8 of the season, where his 32 disposals, 10 clearances, 8 tackles and 1 goal saw him heralded as the team's best on ground for the game. It was announced that Bontempelli had signed a four year contract with the Bulldogs on 25 May 2021, where he stated that it was "an exciting time" for the Bulldogs and himself as a part of the team. By the end of round 10, Bontempelli was tipped to be the favourite for the Brownlow Medal, leading AFL.com.au's Brownlow predictor with 17 votes.

Personal life
Bontempelli is the younger cousin of former  and  player Nick Dal Santo. He supported  in his youth, and cited Matthew Richardson as his all-time favourite player.

Known for his passionate activism on many social issues, Bontempelli was one of three AFL players that came together in 2015 to help advocate against violence towards women, alongside Shaun Burgoyne and Patrick Dangerfield. This was part of the Through the Line campaign. He also featured in a campaign by the Western Bulldogs in 2017 to advocate for marriage equality, where he stated "Marriage equality won't make a difference to the vast majority of Australians but it will make a profound difference to the status and dignity of many". He has volunteered for a charity called Ladder, which aims to improve life for young people in Australia by working with AFL players to mentor young people.

Famous actor Chris Hemsworth starred as Bontempelli in an AFL advertising campaign that ran in the early months of 2017, in order to promote the game to international audiences. Bontempelli co-authored a children's picture book with Fiona Harris, after Affirm Press acquired the rights to the book in September 2020. The book is scheduled to be released on 26 October 2021. He also appeared in a set of advertisements by AAMI insurance throughout 2021.

Statistics
Statistics are correct to the end of round 22 2022

|- style=background:#EAEAEA
| scope=row | 2014 ||  || 4
| 16 || 15 || 10 || 133 || 121 || 254 || 47 || 55 || 0.9 || 0.6 || 8.3 || 7.6 || 15.9 || 2.9 || 3.4 || 4
|-
| scope=row | 2015 ||  || 4
| 21 || 17 || 10 || 261 || 183 || 444 || 69 || 116 || 0.8 || 0.5 || 12.4 || 8.7 || 21.1 || 3.3 || 5.5 || 13
|- style=background:#EAEAEA
| scope=row bgcolor=F0E68C | 2016# ||  || 4
| 26 || 26 || 17 || 301 || 332 || 633 || 99 || 123 || 1.0 || 0.7 || 11.6 || 12.8 || 24.3 || 3.8 || 4.7 || 20
|-
| scope=row | 2017 ||  || 4
| 22 || 20 || 29 || 285 || 220 || 505 || 88 || 138 || 0.9 || 1.3 || 13.0 || 10.0 || 23.0 || 4.0 || 6.3 || 19
|- style=background:#EAEAEA
| scope=row | 2018 ||  || 4
| 19 || 22 || 16 || 258 || 199 || 457 || 63 || 71 || 1.2 || 0.8 || 13.6 || 10.5 || 24.1 || 3.3 || 3.7 || 9
|-
| scope=row | 2019 ||  || 4
| 23 || 15 || 27 || 347 || 259 || 606 || 94 || 116 || 0.7 || 1.2 || 15.1 || 11.3 || 26.3 || 4.1 || 5.0 || 22
|- style=background:#EAEAEA
| scope=row | 2020 ||  || 4
| 18 || 11 || 7 || 211 || 164 || 375 || 59 || 88 || 0.6 || 0.4 || 11.7 || 9.1 || 20.8 || 3.3 || 4.9 || 10
|- 
| scope=row | 2021 ||  || 4
| 26 || 31 || 19 || 396 || 299 || 695 || 104 || 127 || 1.1 || 0.7 || 15.2 || 11.5 || 26.7 || 4.0 || 4.8 || 33
|- style=background:#EAEAEA
| scope=row | 2022 ||  || 4
| 20 || 20 || 17 || 257 || 208 || 467 || 102 || 101 || 1.0 || 0.8 || 12.8 || 10.4 || 23.3 || 5.1 || 5.0 ||
|-class=sortbottom
! colspan=3 | Career
! 191 !! 178 !! 152 !! 2449 !! 1985 !! 4434 !! 725 !! 935 !! 0.9 !! 0.7 !! 12.8 !! 10.3 !! 23.2 !! 3.7 !! 4.8 !! 130
|}

Notes

Honours and achievements
Team
 AFL premiership player: 2016

Individual
 Western Bulldogs captain: 2020–present
 Leigh Matthews Trophy: 2021
 AFLCA Champion Player of the Year Award: 2019
 4× All-Australian team: 2016, 2019, 2020, 2021
 4× Charles Sutton Medal: 2016, 2017, 2019, 2021
 Victoria representative honours in State of Origin for Bushfire Relief Match
 AFLPA best first year player: 2014
 AFLCA best young player of the year: 2015
 Herald Sun Player of the Year: 2019
 Chris Grant Best First Year Player: 2014
 5× 22under22 team: 2014, 2015, 2016 (c), 2017 (c), 2018 (c)
 AFL Rising Star nominee: 2014

References

External links

 
 

1995 births
Living people
Western Bulldogs players
Western Bulldogs Premiership players
Northern Knights players
Australian rules footballers from Melbourne
Australian people of Italian descent
Australian people of Calabrian descent
All-Australians (AFL)
Charles Sutton Medal winners
People educated at Marcellin College, Bulleen
One-time VFL/AFL Premiership players
AFL Academy graduates
People from Eltham, Victoria